10 Days Out: Blues from the Backroads is a CD/DVD and is the fifth release from American blues musician Kenny Wayne Shepherd. The documentary film was directed by Noble Jones and produced by Phillipa Davis. It was executive produced by Kelly Norris Sarno, Devin Sarno, Ken Shepherd, and Kristin Forbes.  It was edited by Mark Morton. The CD was produced by Jerry Harrison. Tour still photography, CD, DVD, and LP photos by Amanda Gresham. 10 Days Out was nominated for two Grammys, Grammy Award for Best Long Form Music Video and Grammy Award For Best Traditional Blues Album at the 50th Grammy Awards and won the 2008 Blues Music Award for Best DVD and the 2008 Keeping the Blues Alive Award under the category of Film, Television or Video.

The documentary portion of the album featured a 10-day venture of Shepherd meeting blues pioneers with the intent of spotlighting veterans of the music genre. Artists include the Music Maker Relief Foundation's Etta Baker, Cootie Stark, and Neal Pattman, as well as B.B. King, Henry Townsend, Hubert Sumlin, Lazy Lester, Clarence "Gatemouth" Brown, David "Honeyboy" Edwards, Pinetop Perkins, and several others. It finished with a concert featuring the surviving members of both Muddy Waters’ and Howlin’ Wolf’s bands. Since completion of the film, at least eleven of the featured musicians have died, adding a cultural significance to the content.

Track listing

References

Documentary films about blues music and musicians
American documentary films
2000s English-language films
2007 albums
Kenny Wayne Shepherd albums
Reprise Records albums
Covers albums